Madani Square,, also known as Madani Chattar or Madani Point, is a monument in Nayasarak Road in Sylhet built to commemorate Hussain Ahmed Madani's contributions towards dawah in Sylhet, Bangladesh. It was completed and opened on 18 February 2019 replacing the junction marking Nayasarak Point.

Construction and history
In early August 2017, the mayor of Sylhet City Corporation, Ariful Haque Choudhury announced his plans to build a monument on Nayasarak Point and to rename it Madani Chattar, after the Islamic scholar Hussain Ahmed Madani.

The monument was designed by Bangladeshi architect Jishnu Kumar Das.

Due to the point being opposite Noyasharak Jame Masjid – a mosque in which the scholar visited and stayed in since 1922, teaching the local community about Islam. During the opening ceremony, Asjad Madani, the scholar's son was also present.

Structure
The structure contains four pillars, designed like mihrabs, which increase in size and a circular base. The tallest one contains a square where the Arabic word "Allahu" is written. The chattar also contains lights which operate at night.

See also
 Allah Chattar, a similar monument built later in Muradnagar
 Shapla Square

References

Monuments and memorials in Bangladesh
Buildings and structures in Sylhet
Islam in Bangladesh
Architecture in Bangladesh
Hussain Ahmad Madani